Anatis mali, the eye-spotted lady beetle, is a species of lady beetle in the family Coccinellidae. It is found in North America. Anatis Mali is a crucial specialized aphid predator in the balsam tree plantation system. A rotation lasting about ten years for balsam trees to grow as Christmas trees under local temperature conditions, there is significant potential for using Anatis Mali in biological management on pre-harvest trees where visual damage maintenance is not essential (Berthiaume et al., 2000).

References

Further reading

 
 
 
 

Coccinellidae
Beetles described in  1825